Woburn Abbey, occupying the east of the village of Woburn, Bedfordshire, England, is a country house, the family seat of the Duke of Bedford.  Although it is still a family home to the current duke, it is open on specified days to visitors, along with the diverse estate surrounding it, including the historic landscape gardens and deer park (by Humphry Repton), as well as more recently added attractions including Woburn Safari Park, a miniature railway and a garden/visitor centre.

Pre-20th century 
Woburn Abbey, comprising Woburn Park and its buildings, was set out and founded as a Cistercian abbey in 1145. Taken from its monastic residents by Henry VIII and given to John Russell, 1st Earl of Bedford, in 1547, it became the seat of the Russell family and the Dukes of Bedford, who demolished the original abbey building and built their house on the monastic site, although the name Abbey was retained. The Abbey was largely rebuilt starting in 1744 by the architects Henry Flitcroft and Henry Holland for the 4th Duke. Anna Russell, Duchess of Bedford, originated the afternoon tea ritual in 19th-century England. Bedford was a keen patron of cricket, and established a cricket ground in the park in the early 1740s. His own club, Woburn Cricket Club, briefly played against major English sides of the day such as London Cricket Club.

In April 1786 John Adams and Thomas Jefferson, both future Presidents of the United States, visited Woburn Abbey and other notable houses in the area.  After visiting them Adams wrote in his diary "Stowe, Hagley, and Blenheim, are superb; Woburn, Caversham, and the Leasowes are beautiful. Wotton is both great and elegant, though neglected". However he was also damning about the means used to finance the large estates, and he did not think that the embellishments to the landscape made by the owners of the great country houses would suit the more rugged American countryside.

Second World War 
Visiting Woburn Abbey in March 1939, the MP and diarist Henry Channon described the well-kept-up "feudal magnificance" of the estate shortly before the outbreak of war. This included more than twenty drawing rooms, thirty cars and whole rooms devoted each to collections of Joshua Reynolds, Canalettos and Van Dyck paintings.

From 1941 Woburn Abbey was the headquarters of the secretive Political Warfare Executive (PWE) which had its London offices at the BBC's Bush House.

1945 to 1970s 

Following World War II, dry rot was discovered and half the Abbey was subsequently demolished. When the 12th Duke died in 1953, his son the 13th Duke was exposed to death duties of $14 million and the Abbey was a half-demolished, half-derelict house. Instead of handing the family estates over to the National Trust, he kept ownership and opened the Abbey to the public for the first time in 1955. It soon gained in popularity and in its first ten years, it had ticket sales of $11 million, helping to pay off much of the death duties. Other amusements were added, including Woburn Safari Park on the grounds of the Abbey in 1970. Asked about the unfavourable comments by other aristocrats when he turned the family home into a safari park, the 13th Duke said, "I do not relish the scorn of the peerage, but it is better to be looked down on than overlooked."

1970s to present 
The 13th Duke moved to Monte Carlo in 1975. His son Robin, who enjoyed the courtesy title Marquess of Tavistock, ran the Abbey with his wife in his father's absence.

In the early 1990s, the Marquess and The Tussauds Group planned to turn the Abbey into a large theme park with the help of John Wardley, creator of the roller coasters "Nemesis" and "Oblivion". However, Tussauds bought Alton Towers and built one there instead.

From 1999 to 2002, the Marquess and the Marchioness, the former Henrietta Joan Tiarks, were the subjects of the Tiger Aspect Productions reality series Country House in three series, totalling 29 episodes, which aired on BBC Two. It detailed the daily life and the business of running the Abbey.

The Marquess of Tavistock became the 14th Duke on the death of his father in November 2002 in Santa Fe, New Mexico, United States. The 14th Duke was the briefest holder of the Dukedom and died in June 2003.

On the death of the 14th Duke, his son Andrew became the 15th Duke, and he continues his father's work in running the Woburn Abbey Estate.  The building is listed in the highest category of architecture at Grade I.

Collection 
The art collection of the Duke of Bedford is amongst the finest in private hands, and encompasses a wide range of western artwork.  The holdings comprise some 250 paintings, including works by Rubens, Van Dyck, Canaletto and Velasquez.  Moreover, the collection encompasses examples of the finest manufacturers of furniture, French and English in many periods, and a diverse collection of porcelain and silverware.

Paintings 

Dutch School
Asselyn, Jan – 1 painting
Cuyp, Aelbert Jacobsz – 5 paintings
Delen, Dirk van – 1 painting
Flinck, Govert – 1 painting
Goyen, Jan van – 1 painting
Potter, Paulus – 2 paintings (A Hawking Party, 1653)
Rembrandt, Harmenszoon van Rijn – 2 paintings (Boaz, 1643 and Self-portrait, 1640)
Ruisdael, Jacob van – 2 paintings
Steen, Jan – 2 paintings
Velde, Willem van de Velde (the Younger) – 1 painting
Werff, Adrian van der – 1 painting

English School
Gainsborough, Thomas – 1 painting
Gheeraerts, Marcus (the Younger) – 2 paintings
Hayter, Sir George – 4 paintings
Hoppner, John – 2 paintings
Knapton, George – 1 painting
Landseer, Edwin Henry – 2 paintings
Reynolds, Joshua – 12 paintings
George Gower – (The Armada Portrait of Elizabeth I, 1588?, one of the greatest English portraits in existence)

Flemish School
Critz, John de – 1 painting
Dyck, Anthony van – 10 paintings (Aubert Lemire, Dean of Antwerp, c. 1630)
Eworth, Hans – 1 painting

French School
Bercham, Nicholas – 1 painting
Lorrain, Claude (known as Claude Gellée) – 2 paintings
Lefebvre, Claude – 1 painting
Loo, Carl van – 1 painting (Portrait of Louis XV)
Poussin, Nicolas – 2 paintings
Vernet, Claude Joseph – 2 paintings

German School
Holbein, Hans (the Younger) – 1 painting

Italian School
Batoni, Pompeo – 1 painting
Canaletto – 24 paintings (View of the Entrance to the Venetian Arsenal, c. 1732 – one of Canaletto's greatest works)
Ricci, Sebastiano – 1 painting
Salvi, Giovanni (Il Sassoferrato) – 2 paintings

Spanish School
Murillo, Bartolomé Esteban – 1 painting
Velázquez, Diego – 1 painting (Portrait of Admiral Pulido Pareja, Captain General of the Armada Fleet of New Spain)

Media appearances

Woburn has been used as a location for filming including: "Five Clues To Fortune" (1957); The Iron Maiden (1962); The Flower of Gloster (1967); A Lizard in a Woman's Skin (1971); an episode of Coronation Street (1973) which featured a cameo by the 13th Duke; and Treasure Hunt (1986).

In Anthony Horowitz's 1987 book Public Enemy Number Two, the book's main character Nick Diamond is framed for the theft of the Woburn Carbuncles. Neil Diamond held two concerts on the front lawn of the abbey, in 1977 and again in 2005.

See also 
 List of monastic houses in Bedfordshire
 Woburn Place, Woburn Walk, Woburn Square in Central London
 Robert Salmon (1763–1821), architect of many buildings on the Duke of Bedford's estate

Notes and references
Notes 
  
References

References

Attribution:

Further reading

External links 

 
The Woburn Abbey Collection of Classical Antiquities in the Arachne (archaeological database)
https://web.archive.org/web/20110612053031/http://www.mspong.org/picturesque/woburn_abbey.html

Gardens in Bedfordshire
Grade I listed buildings in Bedfordshire
Grade I listed houses
Country houses in Bedfordshire
Monasteries in Bedfordshire
Tourist attractions in Bedfordshire
Historic house museums in Bedfordshire
Art museums and galleries in Bedfordshire
Palladian architecture in England
Cistercian monasteries in England
1145 establishments in England
Christian monasteries established in the 12th century
Gardens by Capability Brown
Shell grottoes
Foreign Office during World War II
Monasteries dissolved under the English Reformation
Woburn, Bedfordshire